Bed of Thorns (#Tosirika) is a Ugandan, all-female crew produced drama film directed by Eleanor Nabwiso and produced at Nabwiso Films. The film addresses the issue of gender based and domestic violence. It stars media personality Malaika Tenshi Nnyanzi, Diana Kahunde, youtuber and social media comedian Martha Kay, Agnes Kebirungi, Michael Wawuyo Jr., Housen Mushema, Sara Kisawuzi and Patrick Salvador Idringi.
The film premiered on 30 March 2019 at a red carpet event at Century Cinema Kamwokya, Kampala.

In Cinema
Bed of Thorns was screened on the premier night at Century Cinemax at Acacia Mall in Kampala, at the Uganda National Cultural Centre. It screened at the London Arthouse Film Festival on 12 August 2019.

Production
The film was produced by an all female crew and production started in March 2019. It was marketed with the #Tosirika (Don't keep quiet) to raise awareness about violence against women as a celebration of the women's month of March. The film was both Martha Kay's and Mailaika's film acting debut.

Reception
The film was well received as it tackled everyday issues affecting women in relationships. In fact, after the film was released, one of the supporting actresses Diana Kahunde came out as a victim of psychological violence in her own marriage by her husband and family. The film received the Africa Focus Award for Best Feature Film award at the London Arthouse Film Festival in the UK.

Awards

References

External links
 

Films set in Uganda
Films shot in Uganda
English-language Ugandan films
2019 films
2010s English-language films